"Ay Chico (Lengua Afuera)" is the second single from the album El Mariel by American artist Pitbull. The single was produced by Mr. Collipark. It peaked at number 92 on the US Billboard Hot 100.

Charts

References

2006 singles
2006 songs
Pitbull (rapper) songs
TVT Records singles
Spanglish songs
Songs written by Pitbull (rapper)
Songs written by Mr. Collipark